Deborah Madison is an American chef, food writer and cooking teacher. She has been called an expert on vegetarian cooking and her gourmet repertoire showcases fresh garden produce.  Her work also highlights Slow Food, local foods and farmers' markets.

Early years
Madison grew up in Davis, California, and earned a bachelor's degree with high honors in sociology/city planning in 1968 from Cowell College at the University of California, Santa Cruz. She then cooked at Chez Panisse and was a student for eighteen years at the San Francisco Zen Center. She was the founding chef at Greens Restaurant in San Francisco which opened in 1979. She then cooked for a year at the American Academy in Rome, Italy.

Cookbooks
Madison, whose work concentrates on local foods and farmers' markets, returned to the Bay Area to write The Greens Cookbook with co-author :Edward Espe Brown, and then wrote another 10 books on food and cooking, including Vegetarian Cooking for Everyone, This Can't Be Tofu, Local Flavors, Cooking and Eating From America's Farmers' Market and Seasonal Fruit Desserts from Orchard, Farm and Market, and Vegetable Literacy.

A food columnist for The New York Times, who found he had packed away his cookbooks before moving, joked, "Rather than making me a more natural cook, living so closely with my favorite recipe books brought about what my wife would call learned helplessness. At 46, I ought to be able to make pancakes without running to Deborah Madison for advice. Now, with her inspirational "Vegetarian Cooking for Everyone" boxed up, I've taken the opportunity to cut some apron strings."

Other writing
She has written for the magazines Gourmet, Saveur, Food and Wine, Kitchen Gardener, Fine Cooking, Orion, Organic Gardening and Eating Well, and for the Time-Life Cookbook Series. She has also written for Martha Stewart Living, Bon Appetite, Diversions, Kiplingers, Garden Design, Kitchen Garden, Cooks, Vegetarian Times, Metropolitan Home, East-West Journal, the Los Angeles Times, Home and Garden, and the International Slow Food Journal.

New Mexico
When she first moved to New Mexico, Madison managed the Santa Fe Farmers' Market and served on its board for a number of years.

Madison has been active in the Slow Food movement, founded the Santa Fe Chapter, was active on the ARK committee and served on the scientific committee of the Slow Food Foundation for Biodiversity.

She is on the board of the Seed Savers Exchange and the Southwest Grassfed Livestock Association, and is the co-director of the Edible Kitchen garden at Monte del Sol Charter School in Santa Fe, New Mexico. She lives in New Mexico with her husband, artist Patrick McFarlin, who co-authored and illustrated their book What We Eat When We Eat Alone. She is the founding chef at Café Escalara in Santa Fe.

Awards and honors
In 1987, Madison received the André Simon Memorial Prize. Madison was awarded the 1994 M. F. K. Fisher Mid-Career Award. She was inducted into the James Beard Foundation's "Who's Who of Food and Beverage in America" in 2005 and has received at least three James Beard Foundation Awards. Madison's books have received awards from the International Association of Culinary Professionals (IACP) and Les Dames d'Escoffie. Her first two both were named the Julia Child Cookbook of the Year by the IACP.

Bibliography

Notes

External links
Deborah Madison (deborahmadison.com)

21st-century American women
American chefs
American cookbook writers
American food writers
American women non-fiction writers
Cuisine of the San Francisco Bay Area
American vegetarianism activists
James Beard Foundation Award winners
Living people
People from Davis, California
People from Santa Fe, New Mexico
University of California, Santa Cruz alumni
Vegetarian cookbook writers
Women cookbook writers
Women food writers
Year of birth missing (living people)
Chefs from Berkeley, California